Fedora was the codename for Aleksey Isidorovich Kulak (1923–1983), a KGB-agent who infiltrated the United Nations during the Cold War. While working in New York, Kulak contacted the FBI and offered his services. Kulak told his American handlers there was a KGB mole working at the FBI, leading to a decades-long mole hunt that seriously disrupted the agency. It's not clear whether Kulak was acting as a double agent supplying false information or whether his information was legitimate.

Biography

Kulak was a Soviet war hero, who prior to his work with the Americans was awarded Hero of the USSR, with a PhD in chemistry. He was sent by the KGB to New York City in the early 1960s, with a cover of being assigned as a consultant to the United Nations on the effects of radiation. Kulak was also a close associate and special assistant of the Secretary General of the United Nations, U Thant.

Spying in New York

In March, 1962, Kulak walked into an FBI field office in New York City and offered his service to the FBI in exchange for cash. When asked whether he was worried about having been spotted walking into an FBI office, Kulak immediately offered a tantalizing clue that he knew of a mole in the FBI, telling agents that the KGB's agents were occupied meeting an FBI agent who was spying for the Soviet Union. Kulak referred to this unidentified FBI double-agent as "Dick". Kulak's information set off a decades-long mole hunt in the FBI. It has never been conclusively determined whether or not there was a mole working in the FBI. It has also never been conclusively proven that Kulak's approach to the FBI was not a KGB feint to throw the FBI's counter-intelligence operation into disarray, which his revelation did achieve, as the agency spent significant resources investigating its own agents.

In 1963, Kulak switched his KGB cover to science attaché at the Soviet Embassy, and continued working there until 1967, when he returned to Moscow. In 1971, Kulak returned to New York for a second tour of duty which lasted until 1976. Although he had been considered a reliable source, by the end of his second tour, the FBI was beginning to suspect Kulak was secretly controlled by the KGB and was feeding false information to the Americans. Still, before he left New York City, he was recruited by Gus Hathaway, the CIA agent who handled Adolf Tolkachev, to continue his espionage work for the Americans upon his return to Moscow.

Return to Moscow

In 1977, back in Moscow, Kulak resumed contact with the CIA and provided a valuable list of Soviet scientists attempting to steal U.S. scientific secrets. He promised to provide even more valuable sets of data about the inner-most workings of the KGB and the Soviet Union's efforts to steal American technology. However, when he signaled to make contact with CIA agents, he got no response. CIA director Stansfield Turner had issued orders to the Moscow CIA station to halt contacts with undercover spies, out of fear the station had been compromised. Despite Kulak's attempts to signal for a meeting a second time, contact was never made and his offer of more material was never taken up.

A book by author Edward Jay Epstein published in 1978 described Fedora in enough detail to make it likely that the KGB was able to identify Kulak as the source. With his cover probably blown, the CIA offered to exfiltrate Kulak, devising an elaborate ruse to carry out what would have been a first-of-its-kind operation to pull a spy out of Moscow, but when Kulak was finally contacted, he politely thanked the CIA for its offer, but declined saying he was not concerned for his safety.

Kulak died, apparently of natural causes, in Russia in 1983.

Questions about Kulak's loyalty

Due to the enormous amount of distrust and tumult within the ranks of the FBI inspired by Kulak's claims that a KGB mole was operating at the agency, questions have been raised about whether Kulak was an authentic source of information, or whether he was under the control of the KGB, deliberately feeding false information to the FBI. During his years of service, Kulak was considered a legitimate source by FBI director J. Edgar Hoover, but doubted by CIA's director of counter-intelligence James Angleton.

When Kulak approached the FBI, he was overweight and a heavy drinker. Often during his interviews with FBI agents, Kulak drank from a bottle of scotch, and his frequent inebriation has been cited as evidence that he was a genuine volunteer for the FBI. Besides providing information about a potential mole, Kulak gave the FBI details on Soviet agents, which led to the FBI making a number of arrests and imprisonments, adding to the sense that he was a genuine volunteer. Additionally, Kulak told the FBI that the KGB's mole in the agency had given the Soviets codes the Americans used in their counter-intelligence work, which would have been a major coup and a closely guarded secret for the Soviets, and which appears to have been true.

One argument made for Kulak possibly being a KGB double-agent falsely feeding information to the FBI is that when he returned to Moscow, he suffered no consequences, unlike Dmitri Polyakov who was executed when his work with the FBI was discovered by the KGB.

In 1995, former KGB general Oleg Kalugin said in an interview that not only was Kulak an authentic source, but the KGB did indeed have a mole operating in the FBI at the height of the Cold War. Kalugin said that many in the KGB suspected Kulak of working for the Americans, but his status as a war hero, and recipient of the Hero of the USSR award, protected him.

References

Cold War spies
KGB officers
Soviet spies
20th-century spies
1923 births
1983 deaths
D. Mendeleev University of Chemical Technology of Russia alumni
Hero of the Soviet Union forfeitures